SPS Commerce is a corporation based in the United States that provides cloud-based supply chain management software to retailers, suppliers, third-party logistics providers and partners. The company's headquarters are located in Minneapolis, Minnesota, but also has a US office in New Jersey, and international locations in Beijing, Hong Kong, Sydney, Melbourne, Toronto, and Kyiv. In 2015, the Minneapolis Star Tribune reported that SPS Commerce was ranked by WorkplaceDynamics as the best large workplace in Minnesota. SPS was also ranked among the top 10 fastest growing publicly traded companies in Minnesota in 2014.

History
The company was founded in 1987 under the name St. Paul Software. In 2000, the company sold its software business to Netherlands-based TIE Commerce. After the sale, the company primarily offered Internet-based business-to-business exchanges for retailers and manufacturers. St. Paul Software was renamed SPS Commerce in May 2001. SPS Commerce went public in April 2010 when it debuted on the NASDAQ global market.   SPS has enjoyed 88 consecutive quarters of growth, most of which has been organic.  They do acquire companies in their space where it makes sense, notably:

- 2011: acquired San Diego-based EDI services company Direct EDI for $10.9M, adding 40 employees in a San Diego office and a development group in Ukraine.

- 2012: purchased New Jersey-based data analytics firm Edifice for $26M

- 2014: $14.9M acquisition of LeadTec, an EDI provider headquartered in Melbourne, Australia.

- 2016: $23M acquisition of ToolBox Solutions 

- 2018: $23M acquisition of CovalentWorks 

- 2019: $11.5M acquisition of long-term technology partner MAPADOC

- 2020: $100M acquisition of Data Masons 

- 2021: $17M acquisition of Genius Central

- 2022: $45M acquisition of GCommerce

- 2022: $49M acquisition of InterTrade

In addition to acquiring companies, SPS has been busy acquiring executives to newly created roles to expand the executive team and help drive the company forward

- 2013: SPS hired former Dow Jones CTO Jamie Thingelstad to be CTO 

- 2015: SPS hired former Target Corp CIO Beth Jacob in an executive role.

- 2016: SPS hired Dan Juckniess as CRO

References 

Software companies based in Minnesota
Software companies based in Minneapolis
Companies based in Minneapolis
Supply chain software companies
Companies listed on the Nasdaq
Companies established in 1987
Software companies of the United States